St. Hedwig Parish - designated for Polish immigrants in Union City, Connecticut, United States.

 Founded on February 18, 1906. It is one of the Polish-American Roman Catholic parishes in New England in the Archdiocese of Hartford.

History 
On February 14, 1906, Bishop Michael Tierney dispatched Fr. Ignacy Maciejewski as the first Polish pastor in Union City. Fr. Maciejewski celebrated the first parish Mass at Sokolowski Hall on February 18, 1906. By the year's end, a Polish church was built and formally dedicated on June 2, 1907.

Bibliography 
 
 The Official Catholic Directory in USA

External links 
 St. Hedwig - Diocesan information
 St. Hedwig - ParishesOnline.com
 Archdiocese of Hartford

Roman Catholic parishes of Archdiocese of Hartford
Polish-American Roman Catholic parishes in Connecticut
Naugatuck, Connecticut
Churches in New Haven County, Connecticut